Reece Hodge (born 26 August 1994) is an Australian professional rugby union player for the Melbourne Rebels in Super Rugby. A utility back, Hodge can play fly-half, outside centre, wing or fullback. Hodge completed his secondary Education at Manly Selective Campus, along with fellow Wallaby, Cadeyrn Neville.

Career
Hodge played his junior rugby with the Harbord Harlequins and then later with the Manly Marlins. He made his debut for the Rebels scoring two tries, 2 conversions and 2 penalties totalling 20 points.

Hodge signed a contract with the Melbourne Rebels in 2016.

In Mid-2016, Hodge was called up to replace Mike Harris in the Wallabies squad for the 2016 series against England.

In the opening test of the 2020 Bledisloe Cup, Hodge had a 55 metre penalty goal attempt to win the match that hit the post. The match ended in a 16-all draw.

Super Rugby statistics

References

External links
 Reece Hodge - Melbourne Rebels

1994 births
Australian rugby union players
Rugby union fullbacks
Melbourne Rebels players
People from Manly, New South Wales
Living people
Australia international rugby union players
Rugby union centres
Rugby union fly-halves
Rugby union wings
Sydney (NRC team) players
Melbourne Rising players
Rugby union players from Sydney